Noviherbaspirillum humi is a Gram-negative, non-spore-forming, short rod-shaped, facultative aerobic and motile bacterium from the genus of Noviherbaspirillum which has been isolated from soil from the Ukraine.

References

Burkholderiales
Bacteria described in 2017